Mario Soffici (14 May 1900 – 10 May 1977) was an Argentine film director, actor and screenwriter of the classic era.

Biography 
A native of Florence, Soffici moved to Argentina in the 1920s and began acting in 1931 and directing in 1935 on the film El Alma de Bandoneón, working with popular actors of the period such as Libertad Lamarque in tango-based musical films. He directed some 40 films between 1935 and 1962, most notably Prisioneros de la tierra (1939) (often cited as one of the greatest in Argentine cinema),  El Curandero (1955), El hombre que debía una muerte (1955) and Rosaura a las 10 (1958). He directed and co-wrote with Eduardo Boneo and Francisco Madrid La cabalgata del circo, where Eva Duarte played a supporting role.

He died in Buenos Aires in 1977.

Filmography

As director 
 Noche federal (1932)
 El alma del bandoneón (1935)
 La barra mendocina (1935)
 New Port (1936)
 Cadetes de San Martín (film) (1937)
 Viento Norte (1937)
 Kilómetro 111 (1938)
 El viejo doctor (1939)
 Prisioneros de la tierra (1939)
 Héroes sin fama (1940)
 Cita en la frontera  1940)
 Yo quiero morir contigo (1941)
 El camino de las llamas (1942)
 Vacaciones en el otro mundo (1942)
 Cuando la primavera se equivoca (1942)
 Tres hombres del río (1943)
 Wake Up to Life (1945)
 The Circus Cavalcade (1945)
 Besos perdidos (1945)
 La pródiga (1945)
 Celos (1946)
 The Sin of Julia (1946)
 La gata (1947)
 La Secta del trébol (1948)
 Tierra del Fuego (1948)
 La barca sin pescador (1950)
 El extraño caso del hombre y la bestia (1951)
 The Unwanted (1951)
 Pasó en mi barrio (1951)
 Ellos nos hicieron así (1953)
 Una ventana a la vida (1953)
 La Dama del mar (1954)
 Mujeres casadas (1954)
 Barrio gris (1954)
 El hombre que debía una muerte (1955)
 El Curandero (1955)
 Oro bajo (1956)
 Rosaura a las 10 (1958)
 Isla brava (1958)
 Chafalonías (1960)
 Propiedad (1962)

As screenwriter
 El alma del bandoneón (1935)
 La barra mendocina (1935)
 Viento Norte (1937)
 Con las alas rotas (1938)
 The Circus Cavalcade (1945)
 Una ventana a la vida (1953)
 La dama del mar (1954)
 Barrio gris (1954)
 Oro bajo (1956)
 Rosaura a las 10 (1958)
 Isla brava (1958)
 Los acusados (1960)
 Propiedad (1962)

Actor
 Streets of Buenos Aires (1934)

Bibliography
 Tomas Abraham article about Soffici

External links
 

1900 births
1977 deaths
Italian emigrants to Argentina
Argentine film directors
Argentine male film actors
Male screenwriters
20th-century Argentine male actors
20th-century Argentine screenwriters
20th-century Argentine male writers